Anne Revere (June 25, 1903 – December 18, 1990) was an American actress and a liberal member of the board of the Screen Actors' Guild. She was best known for her work on Broadway and her film portrayals of mothers in a series of critically acclaimed films. An outspoken critic of the House Un-American Activities Committee, her name appeared in Red Channels: The Report on Communist Influence in Radio and Television in 1950 and she was subsequently blacklisted.  

Revere won an Academy Award for her supporting role in the film National Velvet (1945). She was also nominated in the same category for The Song of Bernadette (1943) and Gentleman's Agreement (1947). She won a Tony Award for her performance in Lillian Hellman's play Toys in the Attic in 1960.

Early life
Born in New York City, Revere was a direct descendant of American Revolution hero Paul Revere. Her father, Clinton, was a stockbroker, and she was raised on the Upper West Side and in Westfield, New Jersey. In 1926, she graduated from Wellesley College. Despite her unsuccessful attempts to join dramatic groups in high school and (initially) in college, she eventually was successful at Wellesley and studied dramatics there. She went on to enroll at the American Laboratory School to study acting with Maria Ouspenskaya and Richard Boleslavsky.

Career

Revere gained early acting experience in regional and stock theater troupes. She made her Broadway debut in 1931 in The Great Barrington. Three years later, she went to Hollywood to reprise her stage role in the film adaptation of Double Door. She returned to Broadway to create the role of Martha Dobie in the original 1934 production of The Children's Hour, and in later years, she appeared on the New York stage in As You Like It, The Three Sisters, and Toys in the Attic, for which she won the 1960 Tony Award for Best Performance by a Featured Actress in a Play.

Revere worked steadily as a character actress in films, appearing in nearly three dozen between 1934 and 1951. She was frequently cast in the role of a matriarch and played mother to Elizabeth Taylor, Jennifer Jones, Gregory Peck, John Garfield, and Montgomery Clift. She was nominated for the Academy Award for Best Supporting Actress three times and won for her performance in National Velvet. Additional screen credits included The Song of Bernadette,  Gentleman's Agreement, The Keys of the Kingdom, Body and Soul, and A Place in the Sun.

In 1951, Revere resigned from the board of the Screen Actors Guild. At the time, she was an active member of the American Communist Party. She later pleaded the Fifth Amendment and refused to testify before the House Un-American Activities Committee. A Place in the Sun was her last film role for two decades. She returned to the screen in Tell Me That You Love Me, Junie Moon.

In 1962, television director Joseph Hardy fought for Revere to appear in the popular soap opera A Time for Us. ABC finally agreed to cast Revere in the role and after that Revere appeared frequently in television soap operas like A Flame in the Wind, The Edge of Night, Search for Tomorrow, and Ryan's Hope.

Revere and her husband, theatre director Samuel Rosen moved to New York and opened an acting school, and she continued to work in summer stock and regional theater productions and on television.

Personal life 
Revere married Rosen on April 11, 1935, and they remained wed until his death in 1984. Revere supported Progressive Party candidate Henry A. Wallace's campaign in 1948 and Adlai Stevenson in 1952.

Illness and death
Revere died of pneumonia in her home at Locust Valley, New York at the age of 87. She was survived by one sister. She was buried at Mount Auburn Cemetery in Cambridge, Massachusetts.

Filmography

References

External links
 

1903 births
1990 deaths
Anne
Actresses from New York (state)
American stage actresses
American film actresses
American television actresses
Deaths from pneumonia in New York (state)
Tony Award winners
Best Supporting Actress Academy Award winners
Hollywood blacklist
People from Locust Valley, New York
People from Westfield, New Jersey
Burials at Mount Auburn Cemetery
20th-century American actresses
Wellesley College alumni
Burials in Massachusetts
New York (state) Democrats
New Jersey Democrats
California Democrats
Massachusetts Democrats
People from the Upper West Side